Pierre Paulin (9 July 1927 – 13 June 2009) was a French furniture designer and interior designer. His uncle Georges Paulin was a part-time automobile designer and invented the mechanical retractible hardtop, who was later executed by the Nazis in 1941 as a hero of the French Resistance. After failing his Baccalauréat, Pierre trained to become a ceramist in Vallaurius on the French Rivera and then as a stone-carver in Burgundy. Soon after, he injured his right arm in a fight, ending his dreams as a sculptor. He then went on to attend the Ecole Camondo in Paris. He had a stint with the Gascoin company in Le Havre where he gained an interest in Scandinavian and Japanese design. He was famed for his innovative work with Artifort in the 1960s and interior design in the 1970s.

At the time, his chair designs were considered very modern and unique and kick-started the successes of his designs among the younger population. Even today, his pieces are still being made and are sought after at auctions.

Biography

Early life

Born in Paris in 1927, he had a French father and a German-speaking Swiss mother. He was as well the nephew of Georges Paulin who designed vehicles and invented the first mechanical retractible hardtop roof. Pierre Paulin had failed his Baccalauréat and moved on to train as a ceramist in Vallaurius and then as a stone-carver in Burgundy. Training as a sculptor, he would get into a fight that injured his right arm ending his dreams as a sculptor. He attend the Ecole Camondo in Paris afterwards. Relations with the Gascoin company, he would gain interest in Scandinavian and Japanese design which would influence his works later on.

Early career

Pierre Paulin had his debut exhibition at the Salon des arts ménagers in 1953. Afterwards, he would appear on the cover of the magazine La Maison Française. A year later he would be employed by the Thonet company and began experimenting with stretching swimwear materials over traditionally made chairs. Around 4 years later he would join the Maastricht-based Dutch manufacturers Artifort. Working at Artifort he would become famous worldwide with his Mushroom chair (1960). At his time working for Artifort, Paulin quoted "It represented the first full expression of my abilities. I considered the manufacture of chairs to be rather primitive and I was trying to think up new processes" he said in 2008, he worked with foams and rubbers from Italy all worked around a light metallic frame. He would then use a new stretch material over the chair. His designs were focused on applied design rather than focusing on form with comfort as his chair's starting-point. The combination of these materials made Paulin's chair designs rounder, and comfortable shapes that are still being used in chairs today.

Later career

During the 1970s and 1980s he was invited to decorate and furnish several important places for important people. He redecorated the living, dining, smoking and exhibition rooms of the Elysée's private apartments for Pompidou in 1971. In 1983 he furnished the office of François Mitterrand. In 1979 he launched his own consultancy and worked for Calor, Ericsson, Renault, Saviem, Tefal, Thomson and Airbus.

In 1994 he would retire to the Cévennes in southern France but would still continue on designing furniture. He died on 13 June 2009 in a hospital in Montpellier, France.

Furniture design

Chairs

Pierre Paulin was well known for designing chairs. He worked using foams and metallic frames covered with stretch materials, admired for "their clear lines, the sensual feel of their material or just simply for the way their shapes cradled the body."  His designs were widely popular during their time and have influenced different designers such as Olivier Mourgue. Pierre Paulin influenced Olivier Mourgue's Djinn chairs that were featured in Stanley Kubrick's classic film 2001: A Space Odyssey.

Famous designs
Pierre Paulin was most famous for his innovative designs during the 1960s when he worked for Artifort. His most famed chair designs were the Mushroom chair (1959), Ribbon chair (1966) and Tongue chair (1968).

Interior design

Pierre Paulin was as well highly influential during the 1970s. He was invited by Mobilier national to decorate the private apartments of Georges Pompidou in the Élysée Palace (1971). He was then invited again in 1983 to furnish the office of François Mitterrand. Most of his iconic models were made in collaboration with the Atelier de Recherche et de création - Mobilier national.

He also redesigned the interiors of the Denon Wing of the Louvre Museum, the hall of Tapestries in the Paris City Hall, the Economic and Social Council assembly room, the Green Room of the state radio's Broadcasting House ("Maison de la Radio") the Nikko Hotel and other places.

References

External links
 http://pierrepaulin.com/
 Mobilier national : Pierre Paulin

French interior designers
1927 births
2009 deaths